Fitrat (Urdu: فطرت, lit. 'Nature') is a Pakistani romantic drama soap television series, produced by Abdullah Kadwani and Asad Qureshi under the banner of 7th Sky Entertainment. It premiered on Geo Entertainment from 2 November 2020 to 30 January 2021. It is directed by Asad Jabal and written by Nuzhat Saman. It is digitally available on YouTube and in some countries on VIU App.

Plot 
Fariya finds her way out of hardship through shortcuts. Her widowed mother, too, finds a distraction from hardship. Surprisingly, Fariya's other two siblings, Rafiya and Haris, are poles apart when it comes to pursuing success as they choose to work their way up through honest means. When Fariya's extramarital affair is no longer hidden from her employer-turned-husband Shahbaz, she sets out in quest of another target. She crosses paths with Arbaaz and later finds that there is so much she can use against Shahbaz after marrying his younger brother.

Cast 

 Saboor Aly as Fariya
 Ali Abbas as Shahbaz
 Mirza Zain Baig as Arbaaz
 Zubab Rana as Rafiya
 Zain Afzal as Bilal
 Sabiha Hashmi as Shahbaz, Arbaaz and Alizeh grandmother 
 Seemi Pasha as Abida - Shahbaz, Arbaaz and Alizeh’s mother
 Saife Hassan as Ayaz - Shahbaz, Arbaaz and Alizeh's father
 Fazila Qazi as Memoona - Maliha's mother 
 Farhan Ali Agha as Javed - Maliha's father 
 Adla Khan as Maliha
 Ayesha Gul as Sadia - Fariha, Rafiya and Haris’s mother
 Kamran Jilani as Khalid
 Mariyam Nafees as Alizeh
 Sadaf Aashan as Gulshan 
 Raeed Muhammad Alam as Haris
 Rubab as Sana - Sadia and Khalid's daughter (child actress)

Soundtrack 
The original soundtrack O Zalim was sung by Sahir Ali Bagga and Aima Baig. Composed by Bagga himself, the lyrics were written by Muhammad Mujtaba.

Broadcast
The drama serial premiered on 2 November by replacing Uraan and aired an hour episode daily on Geo Entertainment. Since the series was getting recognition among the viewers, the channel often began to air mega episodes of two hours either on Wednesday or Tuesday.

Production
The project was announced by the director Asad Jabal in early 2020 who has previously directed Mera Rab Waris for the same channel.

It marked the fourth on-screen appearance of Saboor Aly with Ali Abbas after Naqab Zan, Haqeeqat, and Tum Ho Wajah while it was the second with Zubab Rana after Mere Khudaya. Abbas and Rana also appeared in Rishtay Biktay Hain.

PEMRA's notice
The serial received a notice from PEMRA for showing inappropriate dialogues and content in mid-December 2020.

Reception 
The serial got recognition among critics as well as audiences. The role of Saboor Aly received positive reviews from the critics. It maintained high TRP's throughout its run and was among the top dramas in TRP's chart. Due to its popularity, the serial was re-run on the same channel shortly after its end.

Awards and nominations

References

External links
 Official website

Pakistani drama television series
2020 Pakistani television series debuts
Pakistani romantic drama television series
7th Sky Entertainment